Pecteilis radiata (syn. Habenaria radiata) is a species of orchid found in China, Japan, Korea and Russia. It is commonly known as the white egret flower, fringed orchid or sagisō.  The Pecteilis radiata grows with small tubers, from which grasslike leaves emerge. Flower spikes, which can be up to 50 cm tall, produce 2-3 white flowers that bloom in late summer.  It is not to be confused with the white fringed orchid Platanthera praeclara, which is a North American species. The Pecteilis Radiata is the official flower of Setagaya ward, Tokyo.

References

External links 
 
 

radiata
Orchids of Russia
Orchids of China
Orchids of Japan
Orchids of Korea